Richard Sands (born 1950/1951) is an American billionaire businessman, and the chairman of Constellation Brands, a Fortune 500 beer, wine and spirits company founded by his father Marvin Sands.

Biography
His father, Marvin Sands, founded the Canandaigua Wine Company in 1945, aged 21. By 1980, its annual sales topped $50 million, and was renamed Constellation Brands in 2000, and has acquired numerous companies including Robert Mondavi wine and Svedka vodka. In 2013, it acquired the US rights to Grupo Modelo beers including Modelo and Corona.

In 2016, along with his brother and mother, "Mickey", donated $61 million to the Rochester Area Community Foundation, the single largest gift in its history.

Personal life
Sands lives in Canandaigua, New York.

References

Living people
1950s births
American billionaires
People from Canandaigua, New York
American chief executives of food industry companies
American people of Jewish descent